Terrick Victor Henry FitzHugh (27 March 1907 - 20 November 1990) was a film producer and genealogist. He founded the journal The Amateur Historian, now known as The Local Historian and published by the British Association for Local History, and was its first editor.

Early life and family
Terrick FitzHugh was born at Ledbury, Herefordshire, in 1907, the elder son of Rev. Victor Christian Albert FitzHugh (1880–1954), rector of Wensley with Leyburn, Yorkshire and canon of Ripon Cathedral, descendant of a minor gentry family, and Alice Varvara Georgina (d. 1955), daughter of Charles Renny, of Ettrick Lodge, Edinburgh, also of a gentry family. In 1937 he married Mary Pleasant (1914-2005), daughter of wire manufacturer Philip Herbert Ormiston.FamilySearch. Retrieved 15 May 2017. </ref> They had two sons, Terrick and Nigel, and a daughter, Vara.

Career
FitzHugh spent most of his career producing scientific and technical documentary films and films for children through the Children's Film Foundation (CFF). In the late 1940s he was one of the directors of Mining Review, a newsreel for the British mining industry. In 1948 he was listed as production manager for Paul Rotha's companies Rotha Films and Films of Fact in The Kinematograph Year Book and in 1954 he was listed as chairman and general manager of the Documentary Technicians Alliance (DATA). He was associate producer on the CFF's Mystery in the Mine (1959) and Four Winds Island (1961), both with Frank A. Hoare as producer.

His first love, however, was genealogy. He joined the Society of Genealogists in 1943 and in 1952 founded the journal The Amateur Historian, now known as The Local Historian and published by the British Association for Local History, and was its first editor. He became a professional genealogist after his retirement and was one of the founders of the Association of Genealogists and Record Agents. He was made a fellow of the Society of Genealogists in 1988. In 1989 he received the Julian Bickersteth Memorial Medal for innovative services to local history and genealogy.

He spent forty years researching his own family history which was privately published after his death and traced his family back to 1223. The endeavor produced the material for his book How to write a family history: The lives and times of our ancestors (1988) which was published in a posthumous new edition with the additional authorship of Henry A. FitzHugh in 2005. He also wrote The dictionary of genealogy which was published in three editions up to 1991.

Death
FitzHugh died on 20 November 1990. He received an obituary in The Local Historian.

Selected publications
The India Office records as a biographical source. 1981. (Offprint from Family History, October 1981, pp. 41–51.)
The dictionary of genealogy. Alphabooks/A & C Black, Sherbourne, 1985. (2nd revised edition 1986, revised edition 1988, 3rd edition 1991)
How to write a family history: The lives and times of our ancestors. Alphabooks, Sherbourne, 1988. 
The history of the Fitzhugh Family: In two volumes. Henry A. Fitzhugh, Ottershaw, 1999. (With Henry A. Fitzhugh) (revised electronic editions 2007 and 2009)
Fitzhugh: The story of a family through six centuries. Ottershaw, 2001. (Limited to 25 copies)
How to write your family history. Marston House, Yeovil, 2005. (With Henry A. FitzHugh)

References 

English genealogists
English non-fiction writers
1907 births
English film producers
People from Ledbury
Fellows of the Society of Genealogists
1990 deaths
20th-century English businesspeople